Akharan (also Romanized as Ākharān and Ākherān; also known as Ākharūn) is a village in Gafr and Parmon Rural District, Gafr and Parmon District, Bashagard County, Hormozgan Province, Iran. At the 2006 census, its population was 176, in 46 families.

References 

Populated places in Bashagard County